Norman Borisoff (April 16, 1918 – April 21, 2013) was an American television writer, award-winning scriptwriter, and a young adult novelist.

Biography

Filmography

Books
 Nick the Waiter (1966)
 Carmen the Beautician (1967)
 Ned the Taxicab Driver (1967)
 Who's There (with Michal Heron; 1972)
 Don't Give Up (with Michal Heron; 1972)
 Walkie-Talkie Patrol (with Michal Heron; 1972)
 Unknown Adventures (with Michal Heron; 1972)
 Bird Seed & Lightning (with Michal Heron; 1972)
 You Might Even Like It (1973)
 Crazy George (1974)
 Lily, the Lovable Lion (1975)
 The Dropout (1975)
 Lily, the Lovable Lion (1975)
 Dangerous Fortune (1976)
 Starsky and Hutch: A matter of pride (with Robert Swanson; 1977)
 The Goof-up (1978)
 The Haunted House (with Tom Leigh; 1978)
 Easy Money (1981)
 Bewitched and Bewildered: A Spooky Love Story (1982)

See also
 Daily Bruin
 List of The Saint episodes
 Man of the World
 Writers Guild of America Award for Television: Daytime Serials ("Search for Tomorrow" [1985])

References

External links

Norman Borisoff at bfi.org.uk
Norman Borisoff at goodreads.com

Norman Borisoff at movies.msn.com
Norman Borisoff at nytimes.com
Norman Borisoff at tcm.com
Norman Borisoff at worldcat.org

1918 births
2013 deaths
American film producers
American television producers
American male novelists
American male screenwriters
American male short story writers
20th-century American novelists
20th-century American male writers
American television writers
American male television writers
20th-century American short story writers
20th-century American non-fiction writers
American male non-fiction writers